Coleophora inconstans is a moth of the family Coleophoridae. It is found in Mongolia and southern Russia.

The larvae feed on the leaves of Artemisia terrae-albae.

References

inconstans
Moths described in 1975
Moths of Asia